Northern Samar's 2nd congressional district is a congressional district in the province of Northern Samar, Philippines. It has been represented in the House of Representatives since 1987. The district covers the province's eastern half which contains the municipalities of Catubig, Gamay, Laoang, Lapinig, Las Navas, Mapanas, Palapag, Pambujan, San Roque and Silvino Lobos. It is currently represented in the 18th Congress by Harris Christopher M. Ongchuan of the National Unity Party (NUP).

Representation history

Election results

2019

2016

2013

2010

See also
Legislative districts of Northern Samar

References

Congressional districts of the Philippines
Politics of Northern Samar
1987 establishments in the Philippines
Congressional districts of Eastern Visayas
Constituencies established in 1987